Pierre Failliot (25 February 1887 – 31 December 1935) was a French athlete. He competed at the 1912 Summer Olympics in six events: pentathlon, decathlon, 100 m, 200 m, 4 × 100 m and 4 × 400 m relay. He won a silver medal in the 4 × 400 m relay, finished 17th in the pentathlon, and was less successful in other events.

He also played rugby union for France, appearing eight times from 1911 to 1913.

References

1887 births
1935 deaths
French pentathletes
French male sprinters
Olympic silver medalists for France
Athletes (track and field) at the 1912 Summer Olympics
Olympic athletes of France
École Centrale Paris alumni
French rugby union players
France international rugby union players
Athletes from Paris
Medalists at the 1912 Summer Olympics
Olympic silver medalists in athletics (track and field)
Olympic decathletes